The Fresno Grizzlies are a Minor League Baseball team of the California League and the Single-A affiliate of the Colorado Rockies. They are located in Fresno, California, and play their home games at Chukchansi Park, which was opened in 2002 in downtown Fresno. They previously played at Fresno State's Pete Beiden Field from 1998 to 2001.

The Grizzlies were established in 1998 as members of the Triple-A Pacific Coast League (PCL). They won the PCL championship in 2015, making it the only league title in franchise history. Fresno was transferred to the Low-A West league in 2021, but this was renamed the California League and reclassified as Single-A in 2022.

History

Prior professional baseball in Fresno
Professional baseball first came to Fresno in 1898 when it had a team in the original California League. The team dropped out of the league after that year but returned in 1905. In 1906, the Tacoma Tigers of the Pacific Coast League moved to Fresno, playing as the Fresno Raisin Eaters for one season before moving to Sacramento for the 1907 season. In the intervening years before the arrival of the Grizzlies, Fresno fielded teams in the California State League in 1910 and 1913, and in the current California League from 1941 through 1988, including the Fresno Cardinals (1941–1956), Fresno Sun Sox (1957), Fresno Giants (1958–1987), and Fresno Suns (1988).

San Francisco Giants (1998–2014)
When Major League Baseball awarded an expansion team (the Arizona Diamondbacks) to Phoenix, Arizona, that would begin playing in 1998, the Phoenix Firebirds of the Pacific Coast League (the San Francisco Giants' Triple-A affiliate) were forced to move. The Firebirds moved to Tucson, Arizona and changed their name to the Tucson Sidewinders while changing their affiliation to the Diamondbacks. That prompted the Tucson Toros to move to Fresno, giving Fresno its first PCL team since 1906. The Toros were renamed the Grizzlies and became the Giants' new Triple-A affiliate.

From 1998 through 2001, the Grizzlies played at Pete Beiden Field at California State University, Fresno, before moving to Chukchansi Park.

During the team's 11-year history in Fresno, it has had several different owners. In October 2005, the team was sold again, this time to Fresno Baseball Club LLC, headquartered in Delaware.

The team hosted such promotions as K-Fed Night and Second Chance Night in 2006; The Price Is Right Night in 2007; and Totally Rad 80s Night featuring The Karate Kid star Billy Zabka in May 2008.

Parker, the Grizzlies mascot, was named Best Mascot of 2007 by GameOps, beating out all other major and minor league mascots. The Grizzlies former mascot, Wild Thing, "retired" in 2006 after eight years as the team's mascot. Chukchansi Park is also home to the Drag Kings, the Grizzlies' dancing grounds crew who were given an honorable mention by GameOps as Best Entertainment act. The Grizzlies won the Minor League Baseball Promotion of the Year award in 2008 for their "Mascot Showdown" featuring Parker and the Phillie Phanatic.  The team's opening day catcher in 2010, Buster Posey, would be the San Francisco Giants' starting catcher for the World Series six months later (the Giants' starting catcher for most of their World Championship season, Bengie Molina, would start for their opponents, the Texas Rangers), resulting in his National League Rookie of the Year award that year.

Houston Astros (2015–2018)
In 2015, Fresno became an affiliate of the Houston Astros.
That season, they won the Triple-A Baseball National Championship Game by defeating the Columbus Clippers, 7–0, in El Paso, Texas.

Following the 2017 season, Grizzlies manager Tony DeFrancesco announced he would not return to the Houston Astros organization for the 2018 season. DeFrancesco led Fresno to a winning record in each of his three seasons at the helm, his clubs compiling a record of 234–194 (.547) from 2015 to 2017. The run marked the first time in franchise history (since 1998) the Grizzlies completed three consecutive winning seasons.

On January 19, 2018, Rodney Linares was named the 10th manager in Grizzlies history. The team was sold to Fresno Sports and Events, a group led by Ray and Michael Baker, part owners of the Colorado Rockies and Grand Junction Rockies, and Jim Coufos, a prior investor in the High Desert Mavericks, in a transaction that was made official on February 27, 2018.

The Astros declined to renew their player-development contract with Fresno beyond the 2018 season.

Washington Nationals (2019–2020)

The team unveiled new logos, colors, and uniforms for the 2019 season. While retaining the Grizzlies name and grizzly bear imagery, the team switched to a red, black, beige, and brown color scheme with logos and uniforms that resemble the flag of California.

Fresno also gained a new major league affiliate for 2019. The Grizzlies and Washington Nationals agreed to a player development contract for the 2019 and 2020 seasons. The start of the 2020 season was postponed due to the COVID-19 pandemic before being cancelled on June 30. In conjunction with Major League Baseball's reorganization of the minors after the 2020 season, the Washington Nationals opted to discontinue their affiliation with the Grizzlies, leaving them in need of a new affiliate.

Colorado Rockies (2021–present)
In conjunction with Major League Baseball's restructuring of Minor League Baseball in 2021, the Grizzlies were transferred the Low-A West as the Low-A classification affiliate of the Colorado Rockies. They won the 2021 Northern Division title with a 74–41 record. In the best-of-five league championship series, Fresno was defeated by the San Jose Giants, 3–0. Zac Veen was selected as the league's Top MLB Prospect, and Robinson Cancel won its Manager of the Year Award.  In 2022, the Low-A West became known as the California League, the name historically used by the regional circuit prior to the 2021 reorganization, and was reclassified as a Single-A circuit.

Season-by-season records

Popular culture
The 2012 family film Parental Guidance features Billy Crystal as the radio voice of the Fresno Grizzlies. The Grizzlies gained national attention in summer 2015 for playing a game as The Fresno Tacos, which was done to celebrate the city of Fresno's annual  Taco Truck Throwdown and came complete with a specially designed tacos uniform.

Radio
All games are broadcast on KRDU, with Doug Greenwald handling the play-by-play.

Roster

Notable alumni

 Yordan Álvarez, MLB designated hitter/outfielder
 Brandon Belt, MLB first baseman
 Alex Bregman, MLB third baseman/shortstop
 Madison Bumgarner, MLB starting pitcher
 Pat Burrell, MLB outfielder
 Matt Cain, MLB starting pitcher
 Carlos Correa, MLB shortstop
 Brandon Crawford, MLB shortstop
 Adam Duvall, MLB outfielder
 Teoscar Hernandez, MLB outfielder
 Tim Lincecum, MLB starting pitcher
 Joe Nathan, MLB closer
 Joe Panik, MLB second baseman
 Yusmeiro Petit, MLB pitcher
 Buster Posey, MLB catcher
 Sergio Romo, MLB closer
 Brian Wilson, MLB closer

References

External links
 Official website

 
Baseball teams established in 1998
Defunct Pacific Coast League teams
Professional baseball teams in California
Houston Astros minor league affiliates
San Francisco Giants minor league affiliates
Washington Nationals minor league affiliates
California League teams